The 1979 Baltimore International, also known by its sponsored name First National Classic, was a men's tennis tournament played on indoor carpet courts at the Towson State College in Baltimore, Maryland in the United States that was part of the 1979 Grand Prix circuit. It was the eighth edition of the event and was held from January 15 through January 21, 1979. First-seeded Harold Solomon won the singles title and earned $13,000 first-prize money.

Finals

Singles
 Harold Solomon defeated  Marty Riessen 7–5, 6–4
 It was Solomon's 1st singles title of the year and the 16th of his career.

Doubles
 Marty Riessen /  Sherwood Stewart defeated  Anand Amritraj /  Cliff Drysdale 7–6, 6–4

References

External links
 ITF tournament edition details

Baltimore International
Baltimore International
Baltimore International
Baltimore International